Panilla is a genus of moths of the family Noctuidae erected by Frederic Moore in 1885.

Description
Palpi obliquely porrect (extending forward), fringed with long hair below, and with long hair from their base. Third joint minute. Antennae ciliated in male. Metathorax with a slight tuft. Abdomen with dorsal tufts at base. Tibia fringed with long hair in male and spineless. Coxa of forelegs with long hair tufts. Forewings are short with round apex.

Species
 Panilla aroa Bethune-Baker, 1906
 Panilla dispila Walker, 1865
 Panilla spilotis Meyrick, 1902

References

 
 

Calpinae
Moth genera